Nueva Armenia is a municipality in the Honduran department of Francisco Morazán.

External links
Finding the Armenians of Central America

Municipalities of the Francisco Morazán Department